Slippery When Wet is a 1986 album by Bon Jovi.

Slippery When Wet may also refer to:

 Slippery When Wet (Bud Shank album), 1959
 "Slippery When Wet" (song), 1975 song by the Commodores
 "Slippery When Wet" (Nyanda song), 2013 song by Nyanda